Nicholas Ingman (born 29 April 1948) is an English arranger, composer and conductor in the commercial music field. His collaborators include Paul McCartney, Mick Jagger, Björk, and the British X-factor.

Born and educated in London, Ingman moved to the US at the age of seventeen to study at the Berklee College of Music and the New England Conservatory, both in Boston. After returning to London, he took a postgraduate course at the Guildhall School of Music and Drama. His first job was as assistant arranger with record producer Norrie Paramor. While there, here worked with Cliff Richard, the Shadows, Sacha Distel and many more. During this time he composed many library music tracks and the theme tune to BBC TV series Keeping Up Appearances. In 1974, Ingman produced and arranged the six shortlisted songs for the UK's Eurovision Song Contest entry, performed by Olivia Newton-John. He conducted the orchestra for the song chosen by viewers "Long Live Love" at the contest staged in Brighton, UK, where it placed 4th. Going freelance in the mid-1970s, Ingman worked consistently with such artists as Diana Ross, Enrique Iglesias, the Pet Shop Boys, Queen and Tina Turner. He was also employed by a large number of American radio stations to provide easy listening tracks for their networks, scoring over 300 tracks every year. In the 1980s and 1990s, Ingman continued his work with major acts such as Radiohead, Oasis, Annie Lennox, Björk, David Bowie, Elton John, Eric Clapton and Atticus Ross with whom he toured around the USA.

During this time, Ingman worked regularly with the London Symphony Orchestra, and the Royal Philharmonic Orchestra. In 1987, Ingman was invited by the Royal Academy of Music to create the Commercial Music Course, the first one in the country, which he ran for over ten years. Ingman was awarded Hon RAM in 2001 and Hon LCM from the London College of Music where he was a Visiting Professor. His film work as an orchestrator and conductor includes the films as Shakespeare in Love, Billy Elliot, Nowhere Boy and The Passion of the Christ. He conducted the original recording of Jan A.P. Kaczmarek's Oscar-Winning score for Finding Neverland. Ingman's work as an arranger has accounted for 14 No. 1 singles and five double platinum albums in the UK. He has been nominated for a Grammy three times for his work with Eric Clapton, Sade Adu and a recording of West Side Story with the Royal Liverpool Philharmonic.

There is evidence on discog which indicates that Nick Ingman was also involved in the 1973 album Moody a set of instrumental covers of then popular songs such as "While My Guitar Gently Weeps" and "You Are The Sunshine of My Life" released under the name The Gentle Rain (aka Gentle Rain). This album has been heavily sampled as well by artists such as Dr Octagon (in his 1996 release Dr Octagonecologyst).

References

External links 

AllMusic.com – Nick Ingman

Nick Ingman Website
 Discogs https://www.discogs.com/artist/5031938-The-Gentle-Rain-2?noanv=1

1948 births
Living people
Easy listening musicians
Berklee College of Music alumni
New England Conservatory alumni
Alumni of the Guildhall School of Music and Drama
Eurovision Song Contest conductors
21st-century conductors (music)